Atlantic Boulevard/Atlantic Avenue/Los Robles Avenue is a major north–south thoroughfare in eastern Los Angeles County, California.

Route
The street passes through the cities of Alhambra, Monterey Park, East Los Angeles, Eastside Los Angeles, Commerce, Vernon, Maywood, Bell, Cudahy, South Gate, Lynwood, Compton, and Long Beach. 

Atlantic Boulevard starts off as a southerly continuation of Los Robles Avenue at Huntington Drive in northern Alhambra, and ends on East Ocean Boulevard in Downtown Long Beach. Through most of its route from Maywood south, Atlantic travels parallel to the Long Beach Freeway and the Los Angeles River.  South of Randolph Street, Atlantic Boulevard becomes Atlantic Avenue, roughly at the city border of Maywood and Bell.

Highway crossings
Atlantic crosses, with access: Interstate 10 (San Bernardino Freeway), State Route 60 (Pomona Freeway), Interstate 5 (Santa Ana Freeway), Interstate 710 (Long Beach Freeway), State Route 91 (Gardena Freeway), Interstate 405 (San Diego Freeway), former State Route 42 (Firestone Boulevard), and State Route 1 (Pacific Coast Highway).  

It also passes underneath Interstate 105 (Century Freeway) without an interchange.

Public transportation

Bus
Bus service along Atlantic Boulevard/Avenue between Huntington Drive and Artesia Boulevard is provided by Metro Local line 260. Bus service south of Artesia Boulevard is provided by Long Beach Transit line 61.

Light rail
The Metro L Line Atlantic Station is at the intersection of Atlantic Boulevard and Pomona Boulevard in East Los Angeles. It is the southeastern terminus of the Gold Line currently. It connects the East Los Angeles community to Downtown Los Angeles, the San Gabriel Valley, and other Metro rail lines.

See also

References

External links
Los Angeles County Parks Department: Atlantic Avenue Park — 570 South Atlantic Boulevard, East Los Angeles.

Streets in Los Angeles County, California
Streets in the San Gabriel Valley
Transportation in Long Beach, California
Boulevards in the United States
Alhambra, California
Bell, California 
Commerce, California
Compton, California
Eastside Los Angeles
Lynwood, California
Maywood, California
Monterey Park, California
South Gate, California
Vernon, California